Dardoq ( or) is a village and a rural community in Qoʻrgʻontepa District, in Andijan Region in eastern Uzbekistan. It is situated near the confluence of the rivers Kögart and Kara Darya, 6 km south of Dostuk (Kyrgyzstan), 12 km west of Xonobod and 32 km north of Osh (Kyrgyzstan). In 2015 it had a population of 26,055.

References

Populated places in Andijan Region